Singari, aka Goth Singari, is a village and deh in Badin taluka of Badin District, Sindh. As of 2017, it has a population of 7,491, in 1,589 households. It is part of the tapedar circle of Kadhan.

References

Populated places in Badin District